The Petrilaca (meaning "Peter's Place Creek") is a left tributary of the river Mureș in Transylvania, Romania. It discharges into the Mureș near Gornești.

References

Rivers of Romania
Rivers of Mureș County